The following is a list of hospitals in Germany.

Hospitals

Defunct 
 Friedrichs-Waisenhaus Rummelsburg
 Holy Spirit Hospital (Berlin)

References
https://www.newsweek.com/best-hospitals-2019/germany

Germany
 List
Hospitals
Germany
Hospitals